Mikhail Grigorevich Popov (5(17) April, 1893 – 18 December, 1955) was a Soviet botanist. He is known for developing a theory on the role of hybridization in plant evolution, and studying the flora of the Soviet Union and Eastern Europe.

Eponyms 
Popoviocodonia Fed. 1957 Campanulaceae
Popoviolimon Lincz. Plumbaginaceae

References 

Soviet botanists
1893 births
1955 deaths
Academic staff of the Taras Shevchenko National University of Kyiv
Academic staff of the University of Lviv
Burials at Serafimovskoe Cemetery